The South Africa women's cricket team toured India to play against the India women's cricket team in September and October 2019. The tour consisted of three Women's One Day Internationals (WODIs) and six Women's Twenty20 International (WT20) matches. The WODI matches were not part of the 2017–20 ICC Women's Championship.

Ahead of the tour, India's Mithali Raj retired from WT20I cricket, to focus on the 50-over format on the run-up to the 2021 Women's Cricket World Cup. South Africa's captain, Dane van Niekerk, missed the series due to injury, with Suné Luus leading the team in her absence.

India had initially won the WT20I series, after a win in the fourth match gave them an unassailable lead. India had also won the first match, with the next two fixtures abandoned due to rain. However, on 2 October 2019, an extra WT20I match was added to the schedule. India won the fifth WT20I match by five wickets, to confirm their series victory. South Africa won the sixth and final WT20I match by 105 runs, with India winning the series 3–1.

In the WODI series, India won the first two matches to take an unassailable lead. India also won the final WODI match, by six runs, winning the series 3–0.

Squads

Ahead of the WODI series, Smriti Mandhana was ruled out of India's squad with a fractured toe. She was replaced by Pooja Vastrakar.

Tour matches

20-over match: Indian Board President's Women XI v South Africa Women

20-over match: Indian Board President's Women XI v South Africa Women

WT20I series

1st WT20I

2nd WT20I

3rd WT20I

4th WT20I

5th WT20I

6th WT20I

WODI series

1st WODI

2nd WODI

3rd WODI

References

External links
 Series home at ESPN Cricinfo

2019 in women's cricket
2019 in Indian cricket
2019 in South African cricket
cricket
International cricket competitions in 2019–20
India 2019
South Africa 2019